A combination weapon is a close-quarters gun hybrid combining the features of both a firearm and an edged melee weapon. Examples of gun hybrids include knife/pistols and pistol/sword combinations.

History
According to the book Weaponry: An Illustrated History, by Chuck Wills, between the late 16th century and the advances in repeating firearms in the mid 19th century, blades or clubs were often fitted onto guns, because only one shot could be fired from the gun. Without an alternative weapon attachment, they became useless at close range. Some of the first included the German axe-pistol, made in the central European region of Silesia. This weapon combined a flintlock pistol with a battleaxe. Later, a pistol-sword combination formed in the mid 18th century, which was apparently used mainly by marines and naval officers in boarding engagements at sea. Additionally, Dumonthier & Sons produced several knife pistol combinations. Pocket knives with zip guns inside were made by Unwin & Rodgers, and an Indian gunsmith fitted a percussion cap gun to a mace in the 19th century. Even some shields were fitted with barrels, sometimes designed to look like a spike, and other times placed in cleverly concealed holes.

See also 

Gun shield
Pistol sword
Sumpit
Xun Lei Chong

References

 
Firearms
Melee weapons